On October 26, 2019, a mass shooting occurred at a homecoming party in Greenville, Texas, killing two people and wounding 14 others. A 23-year-old man was arrested while at work at a mechanic shop, and charged with murder, but the charges against him were dropped in November 2019. The party was organized for Texas A&M University students, but was off campus. The case is still unsolved.

References

2019 mass shootings in the United States
2019 murders in the United States
Deaths by firearm in Texas
Mass shootings in Texas
October 2019 crimes